Geham is a rural locality in the Toowoomba Region, Queensland, Australia.

Geography

The New England Highway passes through Geham.  The northwest boundary is aligned with Cooby Creek.

Climate 
The city marks the northern boundary of the oceanic climate (Köppen: Cfb) at altitude in Australia, although most of Geham has a humid subtropical climate (Cfa) to the south towards Cabarlah has the first type found such as Geham State School.

History

Highfields Post Office opened on 1 January 1868 and was renamed Geham in 1876.

Highfields No 2 State School opened on 27 March 1871. It was renamed Geham State School in 1875.

Holy Trinity Anglican Church was dedicated on 29 October 1891 by the Very Reverend St Clair Donaldson. Its closure circa 2018 was approved by Bishop Cameron Venables.

Heritage listings
Geham has a number of heritage-listed sites, including:
 New England Highway: Argyle Homestead

Education 
Geham State School is a government primary (Prep-6) school for boys and girls at 9625 New England Highway. In 2017, the school had an enrolment of 140 students with 11 teachers (8 full-time equivalent) and 9 non-teaching staff (5 full-time equivalent).

See also
 List of tramways in Queensland

References

External links 

Toowoomba Region
Localities in Queensland